The arroyo chub (Gila orcuttii) is a species of cyprinid fish found only in the coastal streams of southern California, United States.

The shape of the arroyo chub is somewhat chunky, with a deep body and thick caudal peduncle. The eyes are larger than average for cyprinids. Coloration ranges from silver to gray to olive green above, shading to white below, usually with a dull gray band along each side. The dorsal fin has 8 rays, while the rounded anal fin has 7. Males have larger fins than females, and, during the breeding season, patches of breeding tubercles on the upper surfaces of the pectoral fins. This is a small fish, with most adults in the 7–10 cm length range, and a maximum of 12 cm. 

Omnivorous, their diet includes algae, insects, and crustaceans. Studies of fish from warmwater streams shows a preponderance of algae in the stomach (60-80%), and they are also known to feed on the roots of Azolla (floating water ferns). In cooler streams, molluscs and caddisfly larvae predominate in the diet.

Arroyo chub habitat is primarily the warm streams of the Los Angeles Plain, which are typically muddy torrents during the winter, and clear quiet brooks in the summer, possibly drying up in places. They are found both in slow-moving and fast-moving sections, but generally deeper than 40 cm.

They are native to Los Angeles, Santa Margarita, San Gabriel, San Luis Rey, and Santa Ana Rivers, as well as to Rainbow, Temecula, Malibu and San Juan Creeks. Many of the original populations have been extirpated, but it has recently been reestablished in the Arroyo Seco (Los Angeles County), a tributary of the Los Angeles River.  It has been found in the Los Angeles River (Sepulveda Dam Basin) as recently as 1978. The species also has been successfully introduced in a number of other rivers in the area, and can be found as far north as Chorro Creek in San Luis Obispo County, and as far east as the Mojave River. The Mojave and Cuyama River populations extend into the ranges of related fishes, and hybridize with Mojave chub and California roach, respectively.

The species epithet was chosen in honor of C. R. Orcutt, who in 1889 made the first collection of this fish, improvising by using a blanket as a seine. It is often misspelled as orcutti, although this is still considered a valid synonym, and is for instance used by Moyle in his book.

References

 
 Peter B. Moyle, Inland Fishes of California (University of California Press, 2002), pp. 130–131

 Central Arroyo Stream Restoration Program cf: Chub in the Arroyo Seco

Chubs (fish)
Gila (fish)
Endemic fauna of California
Arroyo chub
Fish of the Western United States
Freshwater fish of the United States
Arroyo chub
Arroyo chub
Arroyo chub
Fish described in 1890